is a Japanese professional boxer who has held the WBO Asia Pacific light-welterweight title since 2019. He is the older cousin of boxers Naoya and Takuma Inoue.

Professional career
Inoue made his professional debut on 29 December 2015, scoring a first-round knockout (KO) victory over Jackson Koel Lapie at the Ariake Coliseum in Tokyo, Japan.

After compiling a record of 12–0 (10 KOs) he defeated Valentine Hosokawa on 6 April 2019 at the Korakuen Hall, Tokyo, capturing the Japanese light-welterweight title via ten-round unanimous decision (UD), with the scorecards reading 98–92, 98–93 and 97–93.

After retaining his title with a fifth-round technical knockout (TKO) against Ryuji Ikeda in July, Inoue defeated Jheritz Chavez on 2 December 2019 at the Korakuen Hall, capturing the vacant WBO Asia Pacific light-welterweight title via seventh-round KO.

Professional boxing record

References

Living people
1992 births
Japanese male boxers
Sportspeople from Kanagawa Prefecture
Light-welterweight boxers
Southpaw boxers
21st-century Japanese people